Radio Margaritaville is a worldwide Internet radio station and SiriusXM Satellite Radio station (Ch. 24) owned by Jimmy Buffett.  It features 24-hour music and live broadcasts of Jimmy Buffett's concerts.

History
Buffett was inspired to create Radio Margaritaville after listening to radio stations in Australia, Key West, and to WOYS in Apalachicola, Florida. He was attracted to the channels' wide range of programming, as opposed to the homogenized playlists he heard elsewhere. He contacted an old friend, Steve Huntington, who agreed to leave terrestrial radio to serve as program director for Buffett's new venture. "When we first started talking about this, we didn't know the Internet would be the route," Huntington said in a 2001 interview. "We figured it would be done in syndication or something. But we started doing some shows on the main Margaritaville site in 1998 and the response was very good." Buffett modeled the channel after pirate radio stations in terms of having no restrictions on what songs to play. It also recalled free-form FM radio of the 1970s with diverse playlists featuring music in the rock, jazz, blues, and folk genres. By 2002, Radio Margaritaville was one of the most popular Internet stations, though it had yet to build an audience that would rival small-market radio stations.

Radio Margaritaville joined Sirius Satellite Radio in 2005 on channel 31 (moving to XM 24 May 4, 2011) and Dish Network channel 6031. It became the first internet station to transition to mainstream radio, and can also be heard on radio.  On November 12, 2008, following the merger of Sirius and XM Radio, the station was added to the XM lineup at channel 55 (moving to XM 24 May 4, 2011).  Radio Margaritaville's program director is Kirsten Winquist and the General Manager is Coleman Sisson. On air talent consists of hosts Kirsten Winquist (VP Programming), Sara West, Jasmine Shinness, Renee Adams, and JD Spradlin. The station is broadcast from The Margaritaville Resort locations in Orlando and Nashville.  Radio Margaritaville now has a stinger often heard between songs of a steel drum with a few notes of "Margaritaville", adding to station identity.

SiriusXM's station, "The Highway," added a Friday afternoon-drive program, Music Row Happy Hour, to its lineup in 2016. Hosted by Buzz Brainard, the show is broadcast from the Margaritaville Restaurant in Nashville and has featured visits from such artists as Brett Eldredge, Maren Morris, and Blake Shelton. The show "created a natural cross-promotion with Jimmy Buffett’s Radio Margaritaville channel." As of August 2017, Radio Margaritaville averages three million unique listeners a week.

Artists played
 Jimmy Buffett
 Mac McAnally
 Jack Johnson
 Kenny Chesney
 Sheryl Crow
 The Beach Boys
 Zac Brown Band
 Bob Marley
 Toots and the Maytals
 Little Feat
 Paul Simon
 UB40
 Jerry Jeff Walker
 Alan Jackson
 Toucans Steel Drum Band
 Crowded House
 Steve Goodman
 John Hiatt
 Lyle Lovett
 James Taylor
 Livingston Taylor
 Keith Sykes
 Sonny Landreth
 The Boat Drunks
 Sunny Jim White
 Bob Dylan
 Tom Petty
 Chuck Berry
 Garth Brooks
 The Neville Brothers
 Allen Toussaint
 Jan and Dean
 The Eagles
 Warren Zevon
 Steve Miller Band
 Pink Martini
 Buena Vista Social Club
 Sam Cooke
 Otis Redding
 Los Lonely Boys
 The Allman Brothers Band
 George Strait
 The Swingin' Medallions
 The Tams
 The Embers
 John Mayer
 Jesse Winchester
 Club Trini
 Keith Urban
 Jeff Bridges
 Third World

See also
 List of Sirius Satellite Radio stations
 Jimmy Buffett's Margaritaville
 Margaritaville

References

External links
 Official Site

Sirius Satellite Radio channels
XM Satellite Radio channels
Sirius XM Radio channels
Jimmy Buffett
Radio stations established in 2005